Awaiting Your Reply is the debut album by American Christian rock band Resurrection Band, released in 1978.

Recording history 
The album was recorded for only $8000 US over a period of two weeks in marathon all-night sessions ending on Easter Sunday morning. A groundbreaking release by Christian music standards at the time, the album caused considerable controversy among Christian music critics, many of whom found fault with controversial themes and its heavy rock sounds, which are clearly influenced by Led Zeppelin. No Christian record label in the United States or Great Britain would agree to distribute the album. The independent label, Star Song Records finally signed Resurrection Band to a record deal. The label soon became one of the largest independents in contemporary Christian music. Many Christian bookstores sold the album from behind the counter, as the cover art was considered too controversial to display openly.

Awaiting Your Reply along with its follow-up, Rainbow's End, quickly solidified Resurrection Band's place in the upper echelon of Christian rock music due to the band's socially conscious Christian lyrics and solid musicianship. In 2001, the album was listed at No. 91 in the book, CCM Presents: The 100 Greatest Albums in Christian Music.

Track listing 
All songs written by Glenn Kaiser unless otherwise noted.

 "Introduction" / "Waves" – 3:36
 "Awaiting Your Reply" – 4:06
 "Broken Promises" – 6:56
 "Golden Road" (Glenn Kaiser, Jon Trott) – 4:56
 "Lightshine" – 5:20
 "Ananias and Sapphira" (Jim Denton) – 2:50
 "Death of the Dying" – 3:18
 "Irish Garden" – 4:52
 "The Return" / "Tag" – 3:57

Personnel 
 Glenn Kaiser - lead vocals, rhythm and lead guitars, dulcimer
 Wendi Kaiser - lead vocals
 Stu Heiss - lead guitar, piano, Moog Mark II, ARP Odyssey, Omni, Avatar
 Jim Denton - bass guitar, acoustic guitar, vocals
 John Herrin - drums
 Roger Heiss - percussion
 Tom Cameron - harmonica
 Kenny Soderblom - saxophone, flute

Production
 Resurrection Band – producer, mixing
 Mal Davis - engineer
 Stu Heiss - engineer, mixing
 Ken Perry – mastering
 Capitol Studios, Los Angeles – mastering location
 JPUSA Graphics – art direction and design
 Janet Cameron – cover art, inside art and layout
 Dick Randall – inside art and layout
 Bob Cox – inside art and layout
 Lyda Price – inside art and layout
 Chuck Cairo – photography

References 

Resurrection Band albums
1978 debut albums